New Empire Cinema may refer to:
 The New Empire Cinema (New South Wales)
 New Empire Cinema (Kolkata)
 New Empire Cinema (Mumbai)

See also
 New Empire Theatre
 Empire Cinemas
 Empire Theatre (disambiguation)